The 2019-20 season is Cherno More's 56th season in the top flight since the establishment of the league in 1948 and the 19th consecutive one. On 13 March the league was suspended for a month due to the ongoing coronavirus pandemic in Bulgaria.

First Professional Football League

Regular season

League table

Results summary

League performance

Bulgarian Cup

Player Statistics

Key

No. = Squad number

Pos = Playing position

Nat. = Nationality

Apps = Appearances

GK = Goalkeeper

DF = Defender

MF = Midfielder

FW = Forward

 = Yellow cards

 = Red cards

Numbers in parentheses denote appearances as substitute.

Source:

References

PFC Cherno More Varna seasons
Cherno More Varna